Fourth Commission of the House of Representatives, more commonly known as Fourth Commission, is one of eleven commissions for the 2019-2024 period, within the People's Representative Council of Indonesia. The commission has the scope of tasks in the fields of agriculture, the environment, forestry, and marine affairs.

Legal basis 

 Law of the Republic of Indonesia Number 17 of 2014 concerning the People's Consultative Assembly, the People's Representative Council, the Regional Representative Council, and the Regional People's Representative Council.
 Law of the Republic of Indonesia Number 42 of 2014 concerning Amendments to Law Number 17 of 2014 concerning the People's Consultative Assembly, People's Representative Council, Regional Representative Council, and Regional People's Representative Council.
 Law of the Republic of Indonesia Number 2 of 2018 concerning the Second Amendment to Law Number 17 of 2014 concerning the People's Consultative Assembly, the People's Representative Council, the Regional Representative Council, and the Regional People's Representative Council.
 Regulation of the House of Representatives of the Republic of Indonesia Number 1 of 2014 concerning Rules of Conduct.
 Regulation of the House of Representatives of the Republic of Indonesia Number 3 of 2015 concerning Amendments to the Regulation of the House of Representatives of the Republic of Indonesia Number 1 of 2014 concerning the Rules of Conduct.

Scope and duties 
Like other commissions, the First Commission has duties in the fields of:

 Agriculture.
 Environment.
 Forestry.
 Marine affairs.

Membership

Composition

Leadership

Members

References 

Commissions of the People's Representative Council